CCM  may refer to:

 Cubic centimetre (ccm), metric unit of volume
 Climate change mitigation (CCM), climate change topic

Biology and medicine 
 Calcium concentration microdomains, part of a cell's cytoplasm
 Photosynthesis#Carbon concentrating mechanisms
 Cardiac contractility modulation, a therapy for heart failure
 Cerebral cavernous malformation
 Certified Case Manager

Computing 
 CCM mode, an encryption algorithm
 Client Configuration Manager, a component of Microsoft System Center Configuration Manager
 Combined Cipher Machine, a WWII-era cipher system
 Community Climate Model, predecessor of the Community Climate System Model
 Constrained conditional model, a machine-learning framework
 CORBA Component Model
 Customer communications management, a type of software

Government 
 Center for Countermeasures, a US White Sands Proving Grounds operation
 Chama Cha Mapinduzi, the ruling political party in Tanzania
 Command Chief Master Sergeant, a US Air Force position
 Convention on Cluster Munitions, a 2010 international treaty prohibiting cluster bombs

Music 
 Aspects of mid-20th century American Christian evangelicism:
 Contemporary Christian music
 CCM Magazine
 Contemporary classical music
 Contemporary commercial music
 University of Cincinnati – College-Conservatory of Music

Schools and organizations 
 City College of Manila, Philippines
 Council of Churches of Malaysia
 County College of Morris, New Jersey, United States

Sport 
 CCM (bicycle company), a Canadian bicycle manufacturer
 CCM (ice hockey), a Canadian sporting goods brand
 Central Coast Mariners FC, an Australian A-League football team 
 Clews Competition Motorcycles, a British motorcycle manufacturer

Other uses 
 Cardinal Courier Media, an overseeing body at St. John Fisher College
 Catherine Cortez Masto (born 1964), United States Senator from Nevada
 Cape Cod Mall, a shopping mall in Hyannis, Massachusetts
 CCM Airlines, an airline of Corsica, France
 Certified Construction Manager, an accreditation by the Construction Management Association of America
 Certified Consulting Meteorologist
 China Chemicals Market, part of Kcomber
 Convergent cross mapping, a statistical test
 Core Cabin Module, a part of the Chinese space station
 Macao Cultural Centre, Macau, China